Glyphodes nitidaria is a moth of the family Crambidae described by Arnold Pagenstecher in 1899. It is known from the Bismarck Archipelago of Papua New Guinea.

References

Moths described in 1899
Moths of Papua New Guinea
Glyphodes